Ghulam Mohammad Farhad (1901–1984) was an Afghan engineer He lived in Germany on a royal scholarship from 1921 to 1928, training as an electrician at the Technical University of Munich. During his studies in Germany, he came in contact with Nazi policy and became fascinated by some aspects of it. After he returned to Afghanistan, Farhad was appointed to several electricity-related posts in the government, finally serving as president of the Kabul Electric Company from 1939 to 1966. He traveled to Germany in 1947 to acquire equipment; he was often accused of favoring German-manufactured products. From 1948 to 1954, he was mayor of Kabul. He notably installed the city's first traffic lights and declared a switch to right-hand driving. In 1966, Farhad created the Afghan Social Democratic Party (also known as Afghan Mellat or "Afghan Nation") on the bases of Pashtun nationalism and pashtunization of multi ethnic Afghanistan where non-pashtuns make the overall majority. He was elected to Parliament, representing the sixth district of Kabul, in 1968, but resigned his seat in 1970.

References

External links 
 Afghan Mellat official biography of Ghulam Mohammad Farhad .

1901 births
1984 deaths
Pashtun people
Pashtun nationalists
Mayors of Kabul
Afghan Millat Party politicians
Members of the House of the People (Afghanistan)
Technical University of Munich alumni
Mayors of places in Afghanistan
Commanders Crosses of the Order of Merit of the Federal Republic of Germany
Afghan expatriates in Germany